The World Trade Centre Montreal (in French, Centre de Commerce mondial de Montréal) is a shopping centre, office and hotel complex located in the Quartier international district of Montreal, Quebec, Canada.

Completed in 1992 by Arcop, it is an example of a 'horizontal skyscraper' and a leading example of urban renewal, architectural preservation and rehabilitation. The complex united several smaller Victorian-era commercial buildings (including the city's historic Bank of Nova Scotia building and Canada Steamship Lines building) by encasing them in a larger form, in this case a massive glassed-in atrium running the length of what was once Fortification Lane, itself the site of the city's colonial defensive walls. In a kind of post-modern hommage, a remnant of the Berlin Wall, given to the city in 1992, is on public exhibit within the complex. The complex includes other historic elements, such as a fountain by French architect and sculptor Dieudonné-Barthélemy Guibal (1699–1757) also donated to the city in 1992. At the far end of the centre is the Montreal InterContinental Hotel.

From the exterior it appears as a quintessential late-19th century Montreal business block with a diverse collection of buildings in different styles. Once inside the rear sections of those buildings have been oriented on to a vast open space, replete with reflecting pool, cafés, boutiques and other diverse services. The interior is united in its impressive open volume and natural lighting, it reveals itself in layers - for the uninitiated the interior space is often thoroughly unexpected.

The centre is connected to Montreal's underground city and to Square-Victoria-OACI metro station towards the West and Place d'Armes and Place Riopelle to the East.

External links
Montreal World Trade Centre — 747 Victoria Square
World Trade Centre

Arcop buildings
Office buildings completed in 1992
Office buildings in Montreal
Old Montreal
Montreal
1992 establishments in Quebec